The Grey Wolves, officially known by the short name Idealist Hearths, is a Turkish far-right paramilitary organization and political movement affiliated with the Nationalist Movement Party (MHP). Commonly described as ultra-nationalist, neo-fascist, and Islamonationalist, it is a youth organization that has been characterized as the MHP's paramilitary or militant wing. Its members deny its political nature and claim it to be a cultural and educational foundation, as per its full official name: Ülkü Ocakları Eğitim ve Kültür Vakfı ("Idealist Clubs Educational and Cultural Foundation").

Established by Colonel Alparslan Türkeş in the late 1960s, it rose to prominence during the late 1970s political violence in Turkey when its members engaged in urban guerrilla warfare with left-wing militants and activists. Scholars have described it as a death squad, responsible for most of the violence and killings in this period. Their most notorious attack, which killed over 100 Alevis, took place in Maraş in December 1978. They are also alleged to have been behind the Taksim Square massacre in May 1977 and to have played a role in the Kurdish–Turkish conflict from 1978 onwards. The masterminds behind the attempted assassination of Pope John Paul II in 1981 by Grey Wolves member Mehmet Ali Ağca were not identified and the organization's role remains unclear. Due to these attacks, the Grey Wolves have been described by some scholars, journalists, and governments as a terrorist organization.

The organization has long been a prominent suspect in investigations into the deep state in Turkey, and is suspected of having had close dealings in the past with the Counter-Guerrilla, the Turkish branch of the NATO Operation Gladio, as well as the Turkish mafia. Among the Grey Wolves' prime targets are non-Turkish ethnic minorities such as Kurds, Greeks, and Armenians.

A staunchly Pan-Turkist organization, in the early 1990s the Grey Wolves extended their area of operation into the post-Soviet states with Turkic and Muslim populations. Up to thousands of its members fought in the First Nagorno-Karabakh War on the Azerbaijani side, and the First and Second Chechen–Russian Wars on the Chechen side. After an unsuccessful attempt to seize power in Azerbaijan in 1995, they were banned in that country. In 2005, Kazakhstan also banned the organization, classifying it as a terrorist group.

Under Devlet Bahçeli, who assumed the leadership of the MHP and Grey Wolves after Türkeş's death in 1997, the organization has been reformed. According to a 2021 poll, the Grey Wolves are supported by 3.2% of the Turkish electorate. Its members are often involved in attacks and clashes with Kurdish and leftist activists. The organization is also active in the Turkish-occupied portion of Cyprus and has affiliated branches in several Western European countries with significant Turkish communities, such as Germany, Belgium, and the Netherlands. They are the largest right-wing extremist organization in Germany. The Grey Wolves were banned in France in November 2020 for hate speech and political violence, and calls for similar actions are made elsewhere. In May 2021, the European Parliament also called on member states of the European Union to designate it as a terrorist group.

Name and symbolism

The organization's members are known as Ülkücüler, which literally means "idealists". Its informal name is inspired by the ancient legend of Asena, a she-wolf in the Ergenekon, a Tengrist ancient myth associated with Turkic ethnic origins in the Central Asian steppes. In Turkey, the wolf also symbolizes honor. The Grey Wolves have a "strong emphasis on leadership and hierarchical, military-like organisation."

The Grey Wolves also use what scholar Ahmet İnsel describes as "fascist slogans imported from America", such as "Love it or leave it" (Ya Sev Ya Terk Et!) and "Communists to Moscow" (Komünistler Moskova'ya).

The salutation of the Grey Wolves is "a fist with the little finger and index finger raised" Turkic hand gesture. It was banned in Austria in February 2019. In Germany, the Christian Democratic Union (CDU) and the Left Party proposed banning the salute in October 2018, calling it fascist.

Ideology
The Grey Wolves adhere to an extreme form of Turkish nationalism. It has been characterized as an ultra-nationalist and neo-fascist paramilitary organization by political scholars, the mainstream media, and left-wing sources. R. W. Apple Jr., writing in The New York Times in 1981, described MHP and its satellite groups as a "xenophobic, fanatically nationalist, neofascist network steeped in violence." The organization's ideology emphasizes the early history of the Turkic peoples in Central Asia and blends it with Islamic culture and beliefs; their synthesis of Turkish identity, political ideology, and Islamic beliefs is referred to as "Turkish Islamonationalism", and is widely prevalent in their rhetoric and activities. One of their mottos is "Your doctor will be a Turk and your medicine will be Islam." Other sources have described it as secular.

Their ideology is based on a "superiority" of the Turkish "race" and the Turkish nation. According to Peters, they strive for an "ideal" Turkish nation, which they define as "Sunni-Islamic and mono-ethnic: only inhabited by 'true' Turks." A Turk is defined as someone who lives in the Turkish territory, feels Turkish and calls themselves Turkish. In their ideology and activities, they are hostile to virtually all non-Turkish or non-Sunni elements within Turkey, including Kurds, Alevis, Arabs, Armenians, Greeks, Christians, and Jews. They embrace anti-Semitic conspiracy theories such as those put forward by The Protocols of the Elders of Zion, and have distributed the Turkish translation of Adolf Hitler's Mein Kampf.

The Grey Wolves are Pan-Turkist and seek to unite the Turkic peoples in one state stretching from the Balkans to Central Asia. After the dissolution of the Soviet Union in 1991, the Grey Wolves called for "a revived Turkish empire embracing newly independent Central Asian states of the former Soviet Union." They have proposed "a pan-Turkish extension of the Turkish nation-state." Due to their pan-Turkic agenda they are hostile towards China, Iran, and Russia.

The Grey Wolves are staunchly anti-communist and have a history of violence toward leftists.

Base
According to sociologist , the Grey Wolves—"the militant youth wing of the Turkish ethnic nationalists that are dissatisfied with the inertia of the Nationalist Movement Party (MHP) camp"—are supported by 3.6% of the Turkish electorate as of 2014. A 2021 poll by Kadir Has University found that a similar percentage, 3.2% of respondents identify as Ülkücü, or supporters of the Grey Wolves.

According to analyst Ankarali Jan, the Grey Wolves have a largely unofficial presence in Turkey's major universities, but their "real power is on the streets, among disaffected poor people in predominantly Turkish Sunni neighbourhoods." Norm Dixon wrote in the Green Left Weekly in 1999 that the MHP and Grey Wolves "retain strong support within the military." In 2018, Tom Stevenson described it as a "street movement."

Links to the Turkish government and NATO

In the late 1970s, former military prosecutor and Turkish Supreme Court Justice Emin Değer documented collaboration between the Grey Wolves, the Central Intelligence Agency (CIA), and Counter-Guerrilla, the Turkish stay-behind anti-communist organization organised under NATO's Operation Gladio, a plan for guerrilla warfare in case of a communist takeover. Martin Lee writes that the Counter-Guerrilla supplied weapons to the Grey Wolves, while according to Tim Jacoby, the CIA transferred guns and explosives to Grey Wolves units through an agent in the 1970s.

During the 1996 Susurluk scandal, the Grey Wolves were accused of being members of the Counter-Guerrilla. Abdullah Çatlı, second-in-command of the Grey Wolves leadership, was killed during the Susurluk car crash, which sparked the scandal. The April 1997 report of the Turkish National Assembly's investigative committee "offered considerable evidence of close ties between state authorities and criminal gangs, including the use of the Grey Wolves to carry out illegal activities."

In the 2008 the Ergenekon trials, a court document revealed that the National Intelligence Organization (MİT) armed and funded Grey Wolves members to carry out political murders. They mostly targeted members of the Armenian Secret Army for the Liberation of Armenia (ASALA), which attacked Turkish embassies abroad in retaliation for the Turkish state's continued denial of the Armenian genocide. The Turkish intelligence services also made use of the Grey Wolves in the Kurdish–Turkish conflict, by offering them amnesty for their crimes in exchange.

In 2018, the AK Party formed an alliance with the MHP which succeeded in re-electing President Erdoğan. Concerns around the close connections between the Turkish government and the Grey Wolves caused the EU Foreign Affairs Committee to recommend that the Grey Wolves be banned in the EU.

History
According to Ruben Safrastyan, because the Grey Wolves are subtle and often formally operate as cultural and sports organizations, information about them is scarce.

Early history
The Grey Wolves organization was formed by Colonel Alparslan Türkeş in the late 1960s as the paramilitary wing of the Nationalist Movement Party (MHP). In 1968, over a hundred camps for ideological and paramilitary training were founded by Türkeş across Turkey. Canefe and Bora describe it as a grassroots fascist network, which had an active role in the economy, education, and neighborhoods. Nasuh Uslu characterized it as a well-disciplined paramilitary organization, while Joshua D. Hendrick compared its organization to the Nazi Schutzstaffel (SS). Young male students and economic migrants from rural areas who have settled in Istanbul and Ankara made up the majority of its members. In 1973 Israeli orientalist Jacob M. Landau wrote that the importance of the Grey Wolves "is attested to by the fact that Türkeş himself assumed responsibility for the formation of these youth groups and assigned the supervision of their training to two of his close associates".

1970s violence and 1980 coup
By the late 1970s the organizations had tens of thousands of members, and according to Amberin Zaman, the Turkish authorities had lost control over it. During the political violence between 1976 and 1980, members of the Grey Wolves were involved in numerous assassinations of left-wing and liberal activists, intellectuals, labor organizers, Kurds, officials, and journalists. The organization became a death squad engaged in "street killings and gunbattles". According to authorities, 220 of its members carried out 694 murders of left-wing and liberal activists and intellectuals. In total, some 5,000 to 6,000 people were killed in the violence, with the Grey Wolves responsible for most of the killings.

Their most significant attack of this period was the Maraş massacre in December 1978, when over 100 Alevis were killed. They are also accused of being behind the Taksim Square massacre on May 1, 1977. The Grey Wolves became a "state-approved force" and used attacks on left-wing groups to "cause chaos and demoralization and inflame a climate in which a regime promising law and order would be welcomed by the masses."
During this violent period, Grey Wolves operated with the encouragement and the protection of the Turkish Army's Special Warfare Department.

The conflict between left-wing and right-wing groups eventually resulted in a military intervention in September 1980 when General Kenan Evren led a coup d'état. According to Daniele Ganser, at the time of the coup, there were some 1,700 Grey Wolves branches, with about 200,000 registered members and a million sympathizers. Following the 1980 coup, the Grey Wolves and MHP were banned and their activity was diminished. Turkish nationalists and others assert that the Grey Wolves were "used and then discarded" by the deep state in Turkey.

Post-1980
After the 1980 coup, the Grey Wolves reorganized. They began to direct their efforts against Kurds in Turkey, as well as lobbying for aggressive denial of the Armenian genocide and support of the Turkish occupation of Cyprus.

Anti-Kurdish violence and activism

1990s
In the 1990s, the Grey Wolves turned their focus on the Kurds and participated in the Kurdish–Turkish conflict in Turkish Kurdistan. In 1999, Hürriyet Daily News described the organization as "the staunchest opponent to the Kurdish cause in Turkey."

In May 1998, the Grey Wolves were involved in two murders. On May 3, a group of Grey Wolves attacked two students in Bolu who were passing by the organization's building. Kenan Mak, one of the students, was killed. On May 5, a worker named Bilal Vural was killed in Istanbul's Şişli district, allegedly by the Grey Wolves. His family claimed that he was "brought several times to the Ülkü Ocakları building where ultranationalists forced him to become a member." They said that he was killed because he was a member of the pro-Kurdish People's Democracy Party (HADEP). As a result of these murders, Republican People's Party (CHP) Deputy Chairman Sinan Yerlikaya and the Freedom and Solidarity Party (ÖDP) requested that the Grey Wolves be banned by the authorities.

During the 1999 general election, the Grey Wolves attacked members of the HADEP, allegedly with impunity.

2000s
In August 2002, the Grey Wolves burnt Masoud Barzani's effigy in a protest in Ankara after he claimed the partly Turkmen-inhabited Iraqi governorates of Kirkuk and Mosul as part of Iraqi Kurdistan.

2010s
On November 9, 2010, Hasan Şimşek, a Grey Wolves member and a student, was killed at the Kütahya Dumlupınar University during an apparent fight between Kurdish nationalist and Turkish nationalist student groups. At his funeral, MHP leader Bahçeli stated that "We expect every kind of measure to be taken to prevent the expansion of the PKK mob, who have a tendency to grow in the universities." Violence between Turkish and Kurdish students also broke out in Marmara University in Istanbul on November 12.

In September 2011, the Ankara Police Department raided 40 locations across Ankara belonging to the Grey Wolves. They took 36 people into custody and seized numerous guns and knives. According to police, the Grey Wolves were planning an attack on the pro-Kurdish Democratic Regions Party (BDP).

In October 2013, the Grey Wolves demonstrated across Turkey against the Kurdish–Turkish peace process.

In October 2014, the Grey Wolves were involved in deadly clashes during the 2014 Kurdish riots in Turkey against the government's perceived collaboration with ISIL during the Siege of Kobanî. A group of Grey Wolves in Sancaktepe, Istanbul, attempted to lynch a young man.

On February 20, 2015, Fırat Yılmaz Çakıroğlu, leader of the Grey Wolves organisation in Ege University, was stabbed to death by left-wing and according to some reports, Kurdish nationalist students.

On September 7–8, 2015, Turkish nationalists, including Grey Wolves members, attacked 128 offices of the pro-Kurdish Peoples' Democratic Party (HDP) across Turkey in an apparent retaliation for anti-government attacks by the Kurdistan Workers' Party (PKK). Some have alleged that some of the attacks were carried out by AKP members "masquerading as Grey Wolves" or that the Grey Wolves cooperated with AKP members in attacks on HDP offices and left-wingers suspected of sympathy for the Kurds.

Greece-related violence and activism
On June 18, 1988 Kartal Demirağ, a senior member of the Grey Wolves, attempted to assassinate Prime Minister Turgut Özal's at the Motherland Party congress. Özal linked it to his visit to Greece three days earlier, saying that the attempt was carried out "by a group opposed to his efforts to improve relations with Greece."

On September 6, 2005, a group of nationalists, led by Grey Wolves leader Levent Temiz, stormed into an Istanbul exhibition commemorating the anti-Greek pogrom of 1955. They threw eggs and tore down photos. The Grey Wolves issued a statement denying involvement.

In the 2000s the Grey Wolves routinely demonstrated outside the Ecumenical Patriarchate of Constantinople in Fener (Phanar), Istanbul and burn the Patriarch in effigy. In October 2005 they staged a rally and proceeding to the gate they laid a black wreath, chanting "Patriarch Leave" and "Patriarchate to Greece", inaugurating the campaign for the collection of signatures to oust the Ecumenical Patriarchate from Istanbul. As of 2006 the Grey Wolves claimed to have collected more than 5 million signatures for the withdrawal of the Patriarch and called on the Turkish government to have the patriarch deported to Greece.

In December 2017 Grey Wolves members, among them the BBP-affiliated Alperen Ocakları, invaded the Hagia Sophia and prayed there in protest against the United States recognition of Jerusalem as capital of Israel.

Anti-Armenian violence and activism
In January 2004 the Grey Wolves prevented the screening of Ararat, a film about the Armenian genocide, in Turkey.

On April 24, 2011, the murder of Sevag Balıkçı, a soldier of Armenian descent in the Turkish Army, was committed by Kıvanç Ağaoglu, who was a sympathizer of Abdullah Çatlı, the late Grey Wolves leader. According to Ruben Melkonyan, an Armenian expert in Turkish studies, Ağaoglu was a member of the Grey Wolves.

On April 24, 2012, the Armenian Genocide Remembrance Day, nationalist groups including the Grey Wolves protested against the commemoration of the genocide in Istanbul's Taksim Square.

In June 2015, during the visit of the Armenian pianist Tigran Hamasyan to the medieval Armenian city of Ani in Kars Province, the local Grey Wolves leader suggested that his followers should "go on an Armenian hunt."

Other acts of violence 
According to Zürcher and Linden, when Sunni radicals attacked Alevis in Istanbul in March 1995, the police in the Gazi quarter were "heavily infiltrated by Grey Wolves" and it was not until the police were replaced by military units that peace was restored.

In December 1996, the Grey Wolves attacked left-wing students and teachers at Istanbul University, with the alleged approval of the police.

In late November 2006 the Grey Wolves staged protests against Pope Benedict XVI's visit to Turkey. On November 22, tens of protesters symbolically occupied Haghia Sophia in Istanbul to perform Muslim prayers. They chanted slogans against the Pope, such as "Don't make a mistake Pope, don't try our patience". Reuters reported that the event was organized by Alperen Ocakları, considered an offshoot of the Grey Wolves. Police arrested around 40 protesters for violating the ban on prayers in the former mosque, which had been a museum since the 1930s.

In July 2014 around a thousand people demonstrated in Kahramanmaraş against the presence of Syrian refugees who fled the Syrian Civil War. Many protesters made the sign of the Grey Wolves, blocked roads in the city and removed Arabic-language signs from stores. AKP lawyer Mahir Ünal commented: "This doesn't make them idealists [i.e. members of the Grey Wolves] but it is certain some people's attempt to show it like something the idealists did."

In July 2015 the Grey Wolves staged protests across Turkey, burnt flags of the People's Republic of China, attacked Chinese restaurants and "tourists who were mistaken for being Chinese" in response to the Chinese government's ban on Muslim Turkic Uyghurs fast during the holy month of Ramadan. Korean tourists were attacked by Grey Wolves. An Uighur worked at the Turkish run Chinese restaurant which was assaulted. Members of the Grey Wolves displayed a banner in multiple locations that read, "We crave Chinese blood." Grey Wolves members attacked the Thai consulate in Istanbul in apparent retaliation for the deportation of hundreds of Uyghurs by Thailand. MHP chairman Devlet Bahçeli stated that "Our nationalist youth is sensitive to injustices in China", and that the attacks by MHP-affiliated youth on South Korean tourists was "understandable", adding "What feature differentiates a Korean from a Chinese? They see that they both have slanted eyes. How can they tell the difference?"

In November 2015, the Grey Wolves protested Russian involvement in the Syrian Civil War near Istanbul's Russian consulate, Ankara, and Adana, accusing Russia of slaughtering Syrian Turkmens.

Presence in Eurasia

Azerbaijan
During the First Nagorno-Karabakh War (1988–94), Grey Wolves members fought on the Azerbaijani side against Armenians, but many reportedly returned to Turkey in late 1992. Around 200 members of the Grey Wolves were still in the conflict zone in September 1994 to train Azerbaijani units.

In 1993, Azerbaijani Interior Minister Isgandar Hamidov established the National Democratic Party, which was known as Boz Qurd ("Grey Wolves"). According to Russian political scientist Stanislav Cherniavsky, the Azerbaijani Grey Wolves grew out of the nationalist Popular Front in 1992 and "considered itself a branch of the Turkish Grey Wolves." It was registered by the Justice Ministry in 1994. In interviews in 1992–93, Hamidov said there was no organisational link with the Turkish organization, stating that the "Grey Wolves of Azerbaijan are not subordinate to the Turkish group".

In March 1995, a coup d'état attempt against President Heydar Aliyev was staged in Baku by paramilitary police chief Rovshan Javadov, Turkish far-right organizations (including the Grey Wolves), and the Azerbaijani opposition. According to Thomas de Waal, the "shadowy backers of this uprising were never identified but appear to have included rogue elements of the Turkish security establishment and members of the 'Gray Wolves' Bozkurt movement." After the coup attempt, Hamidov was jailed, while the Azerbaijani Supreme Court formally abolished the National Democratic Party due to its links to the Turkish Grey Wolves, which it considered to be a terrorist organization. In 2004, Hamidov was freed in an amnesty granted by President Ilham Aliyev. In 2008, Hamidov retired from politics and as president of the party, which had been inactive since. After 2007, the Grey Wolves reportedly used to not operate in Azerbaijan for some time. In the blockades of the Lachin corridor of December 2022 the presence of Grey Wolves was made apparent by their repeated salutations.

China (Xinjiang)
The Grey Wolves "set up training camps in Central Asia for youths from Turkic language groups" following the dissolution of the Soviet Union. Failing to find support in post-Soviet Central Asian republics, they targeted the Uyghurs, concentrated in the Chinese province of Xinjiang and began actively supporting the East Turkestan independence movement. In this scope, the Grey Wolves' European affiliates attacked Chinese tourists in the Netherlands. The Institute of Peace and Conflict Studies suggested in 2012 they are "highly limited in their reach and support base". In March 2020, several Chinese state-run outlets published an article, which claimed that the World Uyghur Congress (WUC) and "its offshoots have forged ties with the Grey Wolves" and that WUC founder Erkin Alptekin met Türkeş on numerous occasions.

Cyprus
Following the Turkish invasion of Cyprus in 1974 the Grey Wolves "continued to play a role in radicalizing the dispute with Greek Cypriots by actively engaging in violence on the island." They actively supported Rauf Denktaş, the President of the unrecognized Northern Cyprus between 1983 and 2005, and were involved, according to Harry Anastasiou, in state-sponsored terror of citizens. In July 1996, Kutlu Adali, a Turkish Cypriot journalist who had criticized Denktaş and his policies, was killed by the Grey Wolves, according to some sources.

In August 1996, the Grey Wolves were involved in an attack on a protest of Greek Cypriots against the Turkish occupation of Northern Cyprus. Tassos Isaac, a Cypriot protester, was beaten to death by the Grey Wolves in the United Nations Buffer Zone.

In July 1997 the Grey Wolves clashed in Northern Cyprus with Kurdish university students who protested against Turkey's invasion of northern Iraq in search of the PKK.

On October 17, 2003, Murat Kanatlı, Turkish Cypriot journalist and editor of the opposition newspaper Yeniçağ, was "attacked by a group of 20-30 persons belonging to the Grey Wolves" according to the International Press Institute (IPI). Kanatlı had covered the Grey Wolves' demonstration against the "intervention" of the European Union and the United States in elections in Northern Cyprus.

During the 2004 referendum on the Annan Plan, the Grey Wolves campaigned for a 'no' vote". During the pre-voting period at least 50 Grey Wolves activists arrived in Northern Cyprus and caused riots against pro-ratification supporters. They were suspected of assaulting motorcyclists carrying 'vote yes' banners.

In October 2013 that the Grey Wolves opened a new headquarters in North Nicosia's Köşklüçiftlik quarter. During the opening ceremony Adem Yurdagül, the chairman of the Grey Wolves in Cyprus delivered a speech, while slogans like  "Nicosia plain is home of Grey Wolves", "Cyprus is Turkish and will remain Turkish", "We are soldiers of [Alparslan] Türkeş", "The Grey Wolves Movement cannot be prevented" were chanted.

In November 2013 a fight broke out between members of the Grey Wolves and Kurdish students at the Near East University in North Nicosia resulting in arrest of 23 persons. According to the newspaper Havadis, "the cause of the fight was allegations by the Grey wolves' organization that some Kurdish students broke the windows of the Grey wolves organization’s building. Around 500 students went out on the streets holding clubs and rocks and the police asked for reinforcement in order to put them under control."

Russia
In November and December 2015, Federation Council member Andrey Klishas and two Communist Party members of the State Duma proposed outlawing the Grey Wolves in Russia. In August 2020, the Russian International Affairs Council, a government think tank, classified the Grey Wolves as an extremist organization.

Chechnya
Members of the Grey Wolves fought on the Chechen separatist side during the First Chechen War (1994–96) and the Second Chechen War (1999–2000). CNN reported in 2000 that the Grey Wolves with most pro-Chechen stance were those affiliated with the Islamist Great Union Party (BBP), which had split from MHP in 1993. The article suggested that they "run the mosques and commercial activities in some parts of Istanbul. It is in these mosques, in the suburbs of the city, that offerings are collected after daily prayers for the Chechen refugees. It is money that probably also goes to soldiers on the front lines." According to Svante Cornell it is "widely believed that the Grey Wolves organised arms shipments to Chechnya, probably with at least the partial knowledge of the Turkish authorities." Russian media has alleged that the Turkish government knew and possibly supported, or at least did not prevent, the activities of the Grey Wolves in Chechnya. Georgian Minister of State Security Valery Khaburdania stated in 2002 that the Grey Wolves were the "conduit of assistance" to the Chechen militants.

Azerbaijani Grey Wolves also participated in the fight against Russia. In January 1995 Kommersant cited the Federal Counterintelligence Service (FSK) in stating that the Azerbaijani Grey Wolves sent 80 fighters to Chechnya. Another 270 fighters went to Chechnya in December of that year.

Crimea
According to a December 2015 report by the independent Russian online newspaper Svobodnaya Pressa, Crimean Tatar nationalists have apparently began cooperating with the Grey Wolves.

Syria
Activists of the MHP and Idealist Hearths have fought in the Syrian civil war, in support of the Syrian Turkmen, whom they consider kinsmen. The MHP and Grey Wolves have provided the Syrian Turkmen Assembly with relief aid and fighters. Syrian Turkmen Assembly president Abdurrahman Mustafa stated in 2016 that "Turkish NGOs, just as the Grey Wolves, give us humanitarian aid." According to Egypt Today the National Intelligence Organization of Turkey (MİT) "is believed to be recruiting retired military personnel to provide support for armed groups operating in Syria, through the Grey Wolves Brigades."

Some Syrian rebel groups have ties to Grey Wolves. One is the Muntasir Billah Brigade. Another is the Turkmen Abdulhamid Han Brigade.

On 24 November 2015, the Turkish Air Force shot down a Russian Sukhoi Su-24M bomber aircraft near the Syria–Turkey border. The pilot was shot in mid-air parachuting toward land by Syrian Turkmen rebels under Syrian Turkmen Brigades. The Turkmen rebel group operated under the command of Alparslan Çelik, a Turkish national and a Grey Wolves member from Elazığ.

Youm7, an Egyptian news site picked up a document allegedly issued by the Army of Conquest (Jaish al-Fatah), which claimed that it conspired with the Turkistan Islamic Party and the Grey Wolves in the December 2016 assassination of Andrei Karlov, the Russian ambassador to Turkey. Russian-state run news TASS agency cited this in a news report.

Thailand
The 2015 Bangkok bombing is suspected to have been carried out by the Grey Wolves due to Thailand's deportation of Uyghur terrorist suspects back to China instead of allowing them to travel to Turkey for asylum. A man with fake Turkish passports using the name Adem Karadag was arrested by the Thai police in connection to the bombing and bomb making materials found in his apartment.

Presence in Western Europe

Austria 
In Austria, the Grey Wolves salute as well as its symbols were legally banned starting from March 1, 2019. It is punishable by fines up to €4,000. Turkey's Foreign Ministry condemned the ban. "[T]he “bozkurt” (“Grey Wolves”) sign, which is a symbol of a legal political party in Turkey and the “rabia” sign that is widely used by Muslims in many countries as well as in Turkey. We do not accept this and we strongly condemn it," read the Foreign Ministry statement. Turkey also called on Austria to "correct this grave mistake," because it "deeply offends Turkey, the Turkish community in Austria and Muslims." In early March 2019, Grey Wolves sympathizers started a campaign on Twitter by sending Chancellor Sebastian Kurz hundreds of photos of people showing the salute. Kurz defended the ban declaring people and organizations that do not accept democratic values, or fight against those values, have no place in Austria.

In January 2020 four Turkish bus drivers were fired in Vienna for making the Grey Wolves sign. On June 26, 2020, Turkish nationalist groups, identified by journalist Jake Hanrahan as Grey Wolves members, attacked Kurdish rallies in Vienna protesting the Turkish operation in Iraqi Kurdistan. Turkey criticized the handling of the violence by the Austrian police and claimed that it was organized by PKK sympathizers.

Belgium
The Belçika Türk Federasyonu (BTF) is considered to be "affiliated with or sympathetic" to the Grey Wolves. According to one study, its aim is "to foster loyalty among young people of Turkish origin to their ancestral culture, religion and history and to keep alive the Turkish identity in Europe. BTF claims to oppose not the integration of Belgian-Turks into their host society but rather their assimilation by it." Its activities mostly focus on "issues relevant to Turkish national sensitivities". For instance, it has demonstrated against the erection of an Armenian Genocide memorial in Brussels. During the municipal elections of 2006 two member of the BTF came to the attention of the media: Fuat Korkmazer on the Flemish Christian Democrats (CD&V) list in Ghent and Murat Denizli on the Francophone Socialist Party (PS) list in Schaerbeek, a commune in the Brussels Region. Korkmazer got a very low number of votes, while Denizli was elected but had to resign because it was discovered he had a false address and lived in another commune. In 2019, sp.a candidate Mustafa Ayutar was linked to the organization. In 2019, Belgian-Kurdish New Flemish Alliance politician Zuhal Demir reported that posters advertising her candidacy in Maasmechelen had been vandalized with swastikas and the symbol of the Grey Wolves.

France
In May 1984, Grey Wolves leader Abdullah Çatlı carried out a bombing of an Armenian Genocide memorial in Alfortville, a Paris suburb.

According to Direction générale de la sécurité intérieure members of the Grey Wolves partook in a January 21, 2012 demonstration in Paris against the adoption of the bill criminalizing the Armenian genocide denial in France.

In November 2020, France banned the French branch of the Grey Wolves organisation after defacement of an Armenian Genocide Memorial, organizing combat training camps in the Ardèche region in 2019, inciting violence against Kurds and Armenians and orchestrating marches targeting Armenians near Lyon. Turkey's Foreign Ministry criticized the ban and said: "we will reciprocate to this decision in the strongest way." In addition, accused the French government of tolerating associations affiliated with the PKK and the FETÖ.

Germany

As a far-right extremist group, the Grey Wolves are monitored by the German authorities. The group brings conflict from their native Turkey into Germany with harassment against Kurds and Armenians as well as the left. According to Neues Deutschland the Grey Wolves are the largest far-right organization in Germany by membership as of 2013. A 2014 Der Spiegel article estimated their membership to stand at no fewer than 10,000 people. A 2017 article published by the Federal Agency for Civic Education estimated over 18,000 members. Its members have actively engaged in attacks on and clashes with Kurds in Germany.

The most important Grey Wolves-affiliated Turkish organization in Germany is Türk Federasyon (Avrupa Demokratik Ülkücü Türk Dernekleri Federasyonu, ADÜTDF), which has around 200 member organizations. Founded in 1978 by 64 nationalist organizations it declined in the 1980s, but revived in the 1990s and claimed to have doubled its membership following the Solingen arson attack of 1993. It denies any direct links with the Grey Wolves in Turkey or the MHP, however, its monthly journal publishes articles praising the MHP and denouncing left-wing and Kurdish organizations in Turkey and Germany. Furthermore, in May 1998 MHP leader Devlet Bahçeli addressed a crowd of 15,000 German Turks at the Türk Federasyon annual meeting. Baden-Württemberg Interior Minister Reinhold Gall stated that Türk Federasyon is a "melting pot of extreme nationalists with Turkish migrant background". Türk Federasyon alone has 7,000 active members (for comparison, the neo-Nazi National Democratic Party (NPD) has 5,000 members). According to educationalist Kemal Bozay, their influence on third generation Turkish youth—who are "looking for an identity"—has "increased significantly". They had ties to the banned Turkish-nationalistic outlaw motorcycle club Osmanen Germania BC.

The 2013 Annual Report on the Protection of the Constitution by the German Federal Ministry of the Interior said that as a result of a June 2013 search by police in three German federal states "two live arms with ammunition, blank-firing guns, batons, electric stun guns and Samurai swords" were seized from members of the Grey Wolves.

The Ministry of the Interior of North Rhine-Westphalia, Germany's most populous state where 70 Grey Wolves associations with more than 2,000 members operated in 2011, also monitors the organization. Nevertheless, a Social Democratic Party member of the state's parliament, stated in a 2011 interview that the threat of the Grey Wolves in Germany is underestimated. He said, "When thousands of Turkish right-wing radicals come together in Essen, we're not worried. But if 100 members of NPD march, we immediately organize a counter-demonstration." Olaf Lehne, a Christian Democratic Union member of North Rhine-Westphalia's state parliament, stated in an interview that the Grey Wolves "are in this country, unfortunately, too often ignored". He also added that they have a large number of sympathizers among young people. Another important organisation affiliated with the Grey Wolves are the ATIB (Turkish: Avrupa Türk-İslam Birliği, ATİB; German: Union der Türkisch-Islamischen Kulturvereine in Europa).

According to the Baden-Württemberg State Government, there are 45 Grey Wolves clubs and associations in that state as of 2012. These associations are often given non-political names (usually cultural and athletic) to conceal their identity.

Netherlands
As early as 1979 the Dutch Scientific Council for Government Policy reported that clashes between the Grey Wolves and the Dutch-Turkish Workers Association (HTIB) occurred on May Day celebrations. Organizations such as Turkish Federation Netherlands (Turkse Federatie Nederland, TFN) and Turkish Islamic Federation (Turks Islamitische Federatie) have links to the Grey Wolves. According to Wangmo and Yazilitas, the Grey Wolves in the Netherlands have engaged in a variety of activities, ranging from criminal activities and nationalist propaganda to support of football teams. The organization was more influential in the 1990s when many first-generation Turkish immigrants "maintained a deep interest in Turkish politics and who had a deeply felt Turkish identity." Grey Wolves activists have participated—with varying successes—in the local politics of several Dutch municipalities. In November 2020, VVD MP Bente Becker introduced a motion to ban the Grey Wolves. The motion was supported by 147 members of the parliament with 3 members voting against it. All three votes against the motion came from Denk.

Sweden
On September 13, 2015, an explosion occurred at a Kurdish civil center in Stockholm, Sweden, following clashes between Turks, Kurds and anti-fascists at a rally organised by the Swedish Grey Wolves.

The Swedish Green Party was hit by a political scandal in April 2016, as images emerged of party member and Housing Minister Mehmet Kaplan attending a dinner party alongside leading members of the Grey Wolves. Kaplan resigned when a 2009 video was made public in which he compared Israel's treatment of Palestinians to that of Jews by Nazi Germany. The Sweden Democrats party have called for the Grey Wolves to be banned in Europe and for its members in Sweden to be deported.

Vatican
On May 13, 1981 Mehmet Ali Ağca, an alleged Grey Wolves member, attempted to murder Pope John Paul II in St. Peter's Square. The masterminds were not identified and the organization's role remains unclear. According to Daniel Pipes and Khalid Duran Grey Wolves appear to have been involved in the assassination attempt and write that Ağca "in his own confused way mixed Turkish nationalist sentiments with fundamentalist Islam." However, Italian investigators could not establish his link to the Grey Wolves.

Norway
There is allegedly a Grey Wolf group recruiting in Drammen, Norway.

Illegal drug trade allegations
Grey Wolves members and leaders have been involved in international drug trafficking since the 1980s. In the early 1980s U.S. anti-terrorism officials at the State Department reported that Türkeş is "widely believed to have been involved" in moving heroin from Turkey into Western Europe. According Stephen E. Ambrose, the leaders of Grey Wolves had built in the late 1980s an army by trading drugs for military equipment, ranging from assault helicopters to tanks. Drugs were transported to Italy, where organized crime processed them. According to Peter Dale Scott, the author of the book American War Machine, in 2010 there were drug producing and dealing groups that had clear ties with the Grey Wolves and its affiliated political party, MHP.

Designation as a terrorist group
In 2005, Kazakhstan banned the Grey Wolves, classifying it as a terrorist group.

Following the November 2020 ban of the Grey Wolves in France for hate speech and violence, and the calls for similar actions to be taken in the Netherlands and Germany, the European Parliament urged, on 20 May 2021, that the 27 member states of the European Union to designate the Grey Wolves as a terrorist group, and thus, marking the first time that an EU institution has linked the Grey Wolves to terrorism. The Turkish government reacted to the EP report by calling it "biased" and "unacceptable", because, according to the Turkish Foreign Ministry spokesperson Tanju Bilgiç, the Grey Wolves are "a legal movement, which is associated with a long-established political party in Turkey." The MFA claimed the "slanders" are "fabricated by the anti-Turkey Armenian diaspora as well as PKK and FETÖ circles."

In September 2021 Representative Dina Titus (D-NV) proposed designating the Grey Wolves as a terrorist group through an amendment to the Fiscal Year 2022 National Defense Authorization Act (NDAA). The proposed amendment asked the US Secretary of State to provide "a detailed report of the activities of the Grey Wolves organization undertaken against US interests, allies, and international partners" and determine if the organization "meet the criteria for designation as a foreign terrorist organization." The state-run Anadolu Agency claimed that the Gülen movement was behind the move.

Cultural references
 In the 2002 film Aram a French-Armenian fighter named Levon attempts to kill a high level Turkish general who is the head of Grey Wolves.
 In the 2003 novel  ("Empire of the Wolves") by Jean-Christophe Grangé the Grey Wolves are involved in a woman's murder. The 2005 film Empire of the Wolves is based on the same-name novel by Grangé.
The left-wing American podcast Chapo Trap House (2016–present) refers to avid fans and Patreon backers as "Grey Wolves," an ironic reference to the podcast's pretended support of Erdoğan and the AKP.

See also
 Ergenekon (organization)
 Vatansever Kuvvetler Güç Birliği Hareketi, an ultranationalist group which was founded by former Grey Wolves
 Nasyonal Aktivitede Zinde İnkişaf

References

Notes

Citations

Bibliography

Further reading
 Barbara Hoffmann, Michael Opperskalski, Erden Solmaz: Graue Wölfe. Koranschulen. Idealistenvereine. Türkische Faschisten in der Bundesrepublik [Grey Wolves. Koranic schools. Idealists clubs. Turkish fascists in Germany]. Köln 1981, .
 Jean-Christophe Grangé: Das Imperium der Wölfe [The Empire of the Wolves]. Bergisch Gladbach 2005, .

External links
 

1969 establishments in Turkey
 
Anti-Armenianism in Europe
Anti-Armenianism in Turkey
Anti-Christian sentiment in Asia
Anti-Christian sentiment in Europe
Anti-communist organizations
Anti-communist terrorism
Anti-Greek sentiment
Anti-Iranian sentiments
Anti-Kurdish sentiment
Armenian
Antisemitism in Turkey
Deniers of the Armenian genocide
Far-right politics in Asia
Far-right politics in Europe
Far-right politics in Turkey
Far-right terrorism
 
Idealism (Turkey)
Nationalist movements in Asia
Nationalist movements in Europe
Neo-fascist organizations
Operation Gladio
Organised crime groups in Germany
Organizations based in Asia designated as terrorist
Organizations based in Europe designated as terrorist
Organizations designated as terrorist by Kazakhstan
Organisations designated as terrorist by the European Union
Organizations established in 1969
Organized crime groups in Turkey
Sunni Islamist groups
Terrorism in Turkey
Turkish nationalist organizations